Milenaka is a rural municipality in Madagascar. It belongs to the district of Toliara II, which is a part of Atsimo-Andrefana Region. The population of this municipality was estimated to be approximately 15,000 in 2001 commune census.

Geography
It is situated in the north of Toliara (Tuléar) on the National road 9.

Only primary schooling is available. The majority 80% of the population of the commune are farmers, while an additional 18% receives their livelihood from raising livestock. The most important crop is rice, while other important products are cotton, maize and cassava.  Services provide employment for 2% of the population.

References

Populated places in Atsimo-Andrefana